OPLL may refer to:

 Ossification of the posterior longitudinal ligament
 Yamaha YM2413